Colotis hildebrandtii, the golden tip, is a butterfly in the family Pieridae. It is found in northern Zambia, Malawi, Tanzania and central and southern Kenya. The habitat consists of dense savanna and Acacia woodland.

Adults have a light and dancing, fast flight.

The larvae feed on Cadaba species.

References

Butterflies described in 1884
hildebrandtii
Butterflies of Africa
Taxa named by Otto Staudinger